Janelle Oredith Arthur (born December 12, 1989) is an American singer and songwriter, who came in fifth place on the 12th season of American Idol.

Early life
Arthur was born on December 12, 1989, in Oliver Springs, Tennessee, to Gentile Dean and Judy Arthur. She grew up in the congregation of the Churches of Christ at Oliver Springs and is still an active member.
When Arthur was eight years old, she portrayed Dolly Parton in a theatrical production of Dolly's life at Dollywood theme park. In 2001, Arthur was hired as a child performer for the Country Tonite Theater, in Pigeon Forge, Tennessee. Arthur later returned to the Country Tonite Theater stage as an adult performer and remained with the cast for another four years. She performed in over 3,000 shows in the Pigeon Forge area from 1998 to 2009.

In 2010, Arthur moved to Nashville, Tennessee, to pursue her music career.

Career

2012-13: American Idol

Arthur auditioned in Charlotte, North Carolina. She had auditioned twice before, in the 10th and 11th seasons. In the 10th season, she was cut in the group round, and in the 11th season she made it to the Las Vegas round. In the semifinals of the 12th season, she performed "If I Can Dream" by Elvis Presley. On March 7, 2013, she was voted into the top 10.  She was eliminated on April 18, 2013 and came in fifth place.

Performances and results

Season 11

Season 12

 When Ryan Seacrest announced the results for this particular night, Arthur was in the bottom two, but declared safe as Burnell Taylor was eliminated.

2013-2017: Recordings and Grand Ole Opry
Arthur took part in the American Idols LIVE! Tour 2013, beginning on July 19 and ending on August 31, 2013. Arthur has been a frequent performer at the Grand Ole Opry, appearing 16 times over the past two years.

Janelle's post-idol debut single, What You Asked For was released on May 6, 2014.

Her first EP, Janelle, was released in November 2015.

On April 21, 2017, Arthur released "Light Myself on Fire" written by herself and Dana Jorgensen and produced by Brad Hill.

2018-present: Runnin' from My Roots
Arthur played country music star Faith Winters in the film Runnin' from My Roots that was released on December 11, 2018.

Discography

Janelle
Produced by Brad Hill

Singles

Filmography

References

External links

 Janelle Arthur on American Idol
 

1989 births
Living people
21st-century American women singers
21st-century American singers
American Idol participants
American members of the Churches of Christ
Singers from Tennessee
People from Oliver Springs, Tennessee